Chong Yong-De (Korean: 정용대, Hanja: 鄭容臺, born 4 February 1978), is a former Japanese-born South Korean midfielder.

Club statistics

References

External links

J. League #29

1978 births
Living people
Association football people from Aichi Prefecture
South Korean footballers
K League 1 players
J1 League players
J2 League players
Pohang Steelers players
Nagoya Grampus players
Cerezo Osaka players
Kawasaki Frontale players
Yokohama FC players
Hokkaido Consadole Sapporo players
South Korean expatriate footballers
Expatriate footballers in Japan
South Korean expatriate sportspeople in Japan
Zainichi Korean people
Association football midfielders